Coqên is a town and seat of Coqên County in Ngari Prefecture of the Tibet Autonomous Region of China. It lies at an altitude of 4,718 metres (15,482 feet). It is on the main route between Lhasa and Kashgar, northwest of Lhaze. Lakes not too far away include Zhari Nanmu Lake, Dawa Lake and Taruo Lake.

Footnotes

See also
List of towns and villages in Tibet

Populated places in Ngari Prefecture
Township-level divisions of Tibet